The following is a list of flags used in Oman. for more information about the national flag, see The Flag of Oman

National Flag

Royal Flag

Political Flags

Military Flags

Historical Flags

See also 

 Flag of Oman
 National emblem of Oman

References 

Lists and galleries of flags
Flags